The tuberoinfundibular pathway refers to a population of dopamine neurons that project from the arcuate nucleus ( the "infundibular nucleus") in the tuberal region of the hypothalamus to the median eminence. It is one of the four major dopamine pathways in the brain. Dopamine released at this site inhibits the secretion of prolactin from anterior pituitary gland lactotrophs by binding to D2 receptors.

Some antipsychotic drugs block dopamine in the tuberoinfundibular pathway, which can cause an increase in the amount of prolactin in the blood (hyperprolactinemia).

Other dopamine pathways
Other major dopamine pathways include:
 Mesocortical pathway
 Mesolimbic pathway
 Nigrostriatal pathway

See also
 Antipsychotic
 Dopamine

References

External links
 
 Diagram

Hypothalamus
Central nervous system pathways
Dopamine